Provincial Disaster Management Authority (PDMA) is a provincial government organization, which deals with natural or man-made disasters in Khyber Pakhtunkhwa province of Pakistan. PDMA's mandate is to engage in activities concerning to all four stages of Disaster Management Spectrum. 

It was established on 14 May 2010 under the National Disaster Management Act, 2010.

In May 2019, the Fata Disaster Management Authority (FDMA) was abolished and its functions were transferred to Provincial Disaster Management Authority (Khyber Pakhtunkhwa), after the Federally Administered Tribal Areas were merged into Khyber Pakhtunkhwa after the passing of the Twenty-fifth and Twenty-sixth Amendments to the Constitution of Pakistan.

See also
 Administrative System of the Federally Administered Tribal Areas
 National Disaster Management Authority (Pakistan)
 Gilgit Baltistan Disaster Management Authority
  State Disaster Management Authority (Azad Jammu & Kashmir)

References

External links
 Official website

Emergency management in Pakistan
Organisations based in Khyber Pakhtunkhwa
Government agencies established in 2010